Bernard Bernard (5 February 1890 – 15 July 1975) was a British wrestler who competed in the 1920 Summer Olympics. In 1920 he won the bronze medal in the freestyle wrestling featherweight class after winning the bronze medal match against Randhir Shindes.

References

External links
profile

1890 births
1975 deaths
Olympic wrestlers of Great Britain
Wrestlers at the 1920 Summer Olympics
British male sport wrestlers
Olympic bronze medallists for Great Britain
Olympic medalists in wrestling
Medalists at the 1920 Summer Olympics